This is a list of Phi Mu chapters and colonies.

Chapters

United States

Notes and references

External links
Phi Mu chapter locator

Phi Mu
chapters